Miguel Keith (June 2, 1951 – May 8, 1970) was a United States Marine who posthumously received the United States's highest military decoration — the Medal of Honor for heroism in Vietnam in May 1970.  Despite being severely wounded, he advanced on enemy attackers, allowing his platoon to rout the attack of a numerically superior enemy force.

Early years
Miguel Keith, a Mexican-American, was born on June 2, 1951, in San Antonio, Texas. He left North High School in Omaha, Nebraska in December 1968, and enlisted in the U.S. Marine Corps Reserve at Omaha on January 21, 1969. He was discharged from the Reserves on April 30, 1969, and the following day, on May 1, 1969, he enlisted in the regular Marine Corps.

Ordered to the Marine Corps Recruit Depot, San Diego, California, on May 2, 1969, for recruit training,  he completed training with the 1st Recruit Training Battalion on July 17, 1969.  He was transferred to the Marine Corps Base, Camp Pendleton, California, for individual combat training with Company B, 1st Battalion, 2nd Infantry Training Regiment.  On August 1, 1969, he was promoted to the rank of Private First Class.

Upon completion of individual combat training on September 18, 1969, he received orders to the Far East. On November 6, 1969, he arrived in the Republic of Vietnam and was assigned as a rifleman with the 1st Combined Action Group, III Marine Amphibious Force.  On April 1, 1970, he was promoted to the rank of Lance Corporal.

While participating in combat in Quảng Ngãi Province on May 8, 1970, he was mortally wounded in the action for which he received the Medal of Honor.  When his platoon was under heavy attack from a numerically superior enemy, Keith was seriously wounded. Despite his wounds, he advanced on the enemy with machine gun fire, killing three of the enemy advancing on the command post and dispersing the others.  He was severely wounded by a grenade during this charge.  In spite of his wounds and loss of blood, he charged a group of 25 attackers, causing them to retreat for cover.  He was mortally wounded by enemy fire.  His actions contributed significantly to his platoon's success in routing the enemy.

Medal of Honor citation

Lance Corporal Keith was buried in Forest Lawn Cemetery, Omaha, Nebraska.

Decorations

His medals and decorations include: the Medal of Honor, the Purple Heart, the Combat Action Ribbon, the National Defense Service Medal, the Vietnam Service Medal with one bronze star, and the Republic of Vietnam Campaign Medal.

In memory
The Wall Miguel Keith has his name inscribed on the Vietnam Veterans Memorial ("The Wall") on  Panel 11W Line 132.

Henderson Hall barracks Keith Hall, a new barracks at Henderson Hall, Headquarters Marine Corps, Arlington, Virginia  was dedicated on March 18, 1983, honoring LCPL Miguel Keith.  A bronze plaque in the lobby recounts the heroic actions of LCPL Keith.

US Navy ship  an Expeditionary Mobile Base (ESB) variant of the  Expeditionary Transfer Dock (ESD), both types of mobile sea bases, has been named in his honor and was commissioned on May 10, 2021.

Miguel Keith Park and Memorial In 1994 a park in South Omaha was named after him. In 2013, a yellow ribbon sidewalk and monument were installed. The Marine Insignia monument from Omaha's Freedom Park relocated after it was damaged in Missouri River flooding in 2011. In 2019, a life size bronze statue was dedicated at Miguel Keith Park in honor of the Medal of Honor recipient.

See also

List of Medal of Honor recipients
List of Medal of Honor recipients for the Vietnam War
List of Hispanic Medal of Honor recipients
Hispanics in the United States Marine Corps

Notes

References

1951 births
1970 deaths
United States Marine Corps Medal of Honor recipients
Military personnel from Omaha, Nebraska
Military personnel from San Antonio
United States Marines
American military personnel killed in the Vietnam War
Vietnam War recipients of the Medal of Honor
Omaha North High School alumni
United States Marine Corps personnel of the Vietnam War